El Maresme  Fòrum is a Barcelona Metro station located between Carrer del Maresme and Rambla de Prim, near the Forum site, in the Sant Martí district of Barcelona, Spain. It's served by L4 (yellow line), as well as providing a connection with the Trambesòs route T4.

Services

External links
Map at the official website of TMB
Metro station at Trenscat.com
Tram stop at Trenscat.com

Railway stations in Spain opened in 2003
Barcelona Metro line 4 stations
Transport in Sant Martí (district)
Trambesòs stops